Celegeri were a Celtic tribe, together with the Dindari a branch of the Scordisci that migrated to Illyria after the Gallic invasion of the Balkans in 279 BC. They inhabited Moesia Superior (modern Central Serbia), and are registered by Pliny as living between the Dardanoi and the Triballi. They appear in north-westernmost Thrace in the 1st century BC. They were replaced by the Romanized Thracio-Celtic Tricornenses.

The Municipium Celegerorum is present Ivanjica, Serbia.

See also
List of Celtic tribes
List of ancient tribes in Illyria

References

Ancient tribes in Serbia
Celtic tribes of Illyria